Livraga is a comune (municipality) in the Province of Lodi in the Italian region Lombardy, located about  southeast of Milan and about  southeast of Lodi.

Livraga borders the following municipalities: Brembio, Borghetto Lodigiano, San Colombano al Lambro, Ospedaletto Lodigiano, Orio Litta.

Demographic evolution

References

External links
 www.comune.livraga.lo.it

Cities and towns in Lombardy